Angelo Brignole (10 March 1924 – 19 February 2006) was an Italian racing cyclist. He was an active cyclist between 1946 and 1950. He rode in the 1949 Tour de France.

References

External links
 

1924 births
2006 deaths
Italian male cyclists
Sportspeople from the Province of Genoa
Cyclists from Liguria